Cow sharks are a shark family, the Hexanchidae, characterized by an additional pair or pairs of gill slits. Its 37 species are placed within the 10 genera: Gladioserratus, Heptranchias, Hexanchus, Notidanodon, Notorynchus, Pachyhexanchus, Paraheptranchias, Pseudonotidanus, Welcommia, and Weltonia.

Cow sharks are considered the most primitive of all the sharks, as their skeletons resemble those of ancient extinct forms, with few modern adaptations. Their excretory and digestive systems are also unspecialized, suggesting they may resemble those of primitive shark ancestors. A possible hexanchid tooth is known from the Permian of Japan, making the family a possible extant survivor of the Permian-Triassic extinction.

Their most distinctive feature, however, is the presence of a sixth, and, in two genera, a seventh, gill slit, in contrast to the five found in all other sharks.

Cow sharks are ovoviviparous, with the mother retaining the egg cases in her body until they hatch. They feed on relatively large fish of all kinds, including other sharks, as well as on crustaceans and carrion.

The only fossil records of the cow shark consist of mainly only isolated teeth. Although skeletal remains for this species have been found from the Jurassic time period, these have been very rare and have only been found in the "Late Jurassic lithographic limestones of South Germany, Nusplingen, Solnhofen, and late Cretaceous calcareous sediments of Lebanon." Due to these sparse records some scientists conclude that the cow shark is now a more "diverse and numerous species".

Species 

The 37 species of cow shark, in 10 genera, are:
 †Gladioserratus Underwood, Goswami, Prasad, Verma & Flynn, 2011
 †Gladioserratus aptiensis Pictet, 1864
 †Gladioserratus dentatus Guinot, Cappetta & Adnet, 2014
 †Gladioserratus magnus Underwood, Goswami, Prasad, Verma & Flynn, 2011
 Heptranchias Rafinesque, 1810
 Heptranchias perlo (Bonnaterre, 1788) (sharpnose sevengill shark)
 †Heptranchias ezoensis Applegate & Uyeno, 1968
 †Heptranchias howelli Reed, 1946
 †Heptranchias karagalensis Kozlov in Zhelezko & Kozlov, 1999
 †Heptranchias tenuidens Leriche, 1938
 Hexanchus Rafinesque, 1810
 Hexanchus griseus (Bonnaterre, 1788) (bluntnose sixgill shark)
 Hexanchus nakamurai Teng, 1962 (bigeyed sixgill shark) 
 Hexanchus vitulus Daly-Engel, 2018 (atlantic sixgill shark)
 †Hexanchus agassizi  Cappetta, 1976
 †Hexanchus andersoni Jordan, 1907
 †Hexanchus casieri Kozlov, 1999
 †Hexanchus collinsonae Ward, 1979
 †Hexanchus gracilis Davis, 1887
 †Hexanchus hookeri Ward, 1979
 †Hexanchus microdon Agassiz, 1843
 †Hexanchus tusbairicus Kozlov in Zhelezko & Kozlov, 1999
 †Notidanodon Cappetta, 1975
 †Notidanodon brotzeni Siverson, 1995
 †Notidanodon dentatus Woodward, 1886
 †Notidanodon lanceolatus Woodward, 1886
 †Notidanodon loozi Vincent, 1876
 †Notidanodon pectinatus Agassiz, 1843
 Notorynchus Ayres, 1855
 Notorynchus cepedianus (Péron, 1807) (broadnose sevengill shark)
 †Notorynchus borealus Jordan & Hannibal, 1923
 †Notorynchus kempi Ward, 1979
 †Notorynchus lawleyi Cigala Fulgosi, 1983
 †Notorynchus primigenius Agassiz, 1843
 †Notorynchus serratissimus Agassiz, 1843
 †Notorynchus subrecurvus Oppenheimer, 1907
 †Pachyhexanchus Cappetta, 1990
 †Pachyhexanchus pockrandti Ward & Thies, 1987
 †Paraheptranchias Pfeil, 1981
 †Paraheptranchias repens Probst, 1879
 †Pseudonotidanus Underwood & Ward, 2004
 †Pseudonotidanus semirugosus Underwood & Ward, 2004
 †Welcommia Klug & Kriwet, 2010
 †Welcommia bodeuri Cappetta, 1990
 †Welcommia cappettai Klug & Kriwet, 2010
 †Weltonia Ward, 1979
 †Weltonia ancistrodon Arambourg, 1952
 †Weltonia burnhamensis Ward, 1979

References

External links
 ReefQuest Centre: Order Hexanchiformes: Cow Sharks

Hexanchiformes
Extant Late Jurassic first appearances
Taxa named by John Edward Gray